The Zarma people are an ethnic group predominantly found in westernmost Niger. They are also found in significant numbers in the adjacent areas of Nigeria and Benin, along with smaller numbers in Burkina Faso, Ivory Coast, Ghana, Togo, and Sudan. In Niger, the Zarma are often considered by outsiders to be of the same ethnicity as the neighboring Songhai proper, although the two groups claim differences, having different histories and speaking different dialects. They are sometimes lumped together as the Zarma-Songhay or Songhay-Zarma.

The Zarma people are predominantly Muslims of the Maliki-Sunni school, and they live in the arid Sahel lands, along the Niger River valley which is a source of irrigation, forage for cattle herds, and drinking water. Relatively prosperous, they own cattle, sheep, goats and dromedaries, renting them out to the Fulani people or Tuareg people for tending. The Zarma people have had a history of slave and caste systems, like many West African ethnic groups. Like them, they also have had a historical musical tradition.

The Zarma people are alternatively referred to as Zerma, Zaberma, Zabarma Zabermawa, Djerma, Dyerma, Jerma, or other terms. Zarma is the term used by the Zarma people themselves.

Demographics and language
The estimates for the total population of Zarma people as of 2013 has been generally placed over 3 million, but it varies. They constitute several smaller ethnic sub-groups, who were either indigenous to the era prior to the Songhai Empire and have assimilated into the Zarma people, or else are people of Zarma origins who have differentiated themselves some time in the precolonial period (through dialect, political structure, or religion), but these are difficult to differentiate according to Fuglestad. Groups usually referred to as part of the Zarma or Songhay, but who have traceable historical distinctions include the Gabda, Tinga, Sorko, Kalles, Golles, Loqas and Kurtey peoples.

The Zarma language is one of the southern Songhai languages, a branch of the Nilo-Saharan language family. Because of the common language and culture, they are sometimes referred to as "Zarma Songhay" (also spelled "Djerma-Songhai").

History

The Zarma people are an African ethnic group with unrecorded history and no ancient texts. Like other ethnic groups of the region, much of their known history comes from Islamic records after the 8th century, particularly from the medieval accounts of Arabs and North African historians, states Margari Aziza Hill – a professor of humanities. The Islamic conquest was motivated and facilitated by the pre-existing trade between West Africa and the Mediterranean before Islam arrived, and in turn the arrival of Islam influenced the history of all people including the Zarma. North African Muslims increased the trans-Saharan trade, becoming of growing importance to the fortunes of ethnic groups and their chiefs. The Muslim traders were major actors in introducing Islam. The Sahel, which forms the origins and historic home of the Zarma people, has been the economic and ecological transition zone and travel route strategically located between the inhospitable Sahara desert and dense sub-Saharan forest zone of Africa.

The Niger delta region already had major settlements of people before Islam arrived. Early Arab documents from the eighth century suggest that Muslims went into West Africa for trade, exchanging salt, horses, dates, and camels they had from the North and Arabian lands with gold, timber, and food from Niger river valley and nearby regions controlled by Songhay-Zarma people. This trade and commerce also ultimately led to cultural and religious conversion. Various theories have been proposed as to how, when and why Zarma people converted to Islam. According to Arabic records, the Maliki school of Islamic jurisprudence became the predominant system of rule in Niger river region and West Africa by the 11th-century, after the Almoravid conquest of North Africa, Niger river, Ghanaian Koumbi Saleh and Senegal river regions. Muslim scholars dispute if these early Islamic documents are reliable, with some disputing the "conquest" language, insisting that it was a peaceful, willing conversion from the old Islamic system to the new Maliki school. For example, Ahmad Baba in 1615 CE stated that black African Muslims willingly adopted Islam, not because of military threat.

The Zarma people migrated south-eastward from Niger Bend region of Mali where Songhay people are found in high concentration, into their current geographic concentration around the Niger river valley during the Songhai Empire period, settling in many towns, and particularly what is now Southwest Niger near the capital Niamey. Their migration to their present homeland was led by Mali Bero, a legendary king of the Zarma. According to oral tradition, Mali Bero decided to migrate with his people following a fight between the Zarma and a neighboring Tuareg village. They first settled in the Zarmaganda, later expanding south into the Dallol Bosso valley and Dosso.

Forming a number of small communities, each led by a chief or ruler called Zarmakoy, these polities were in conflict for economically and agriculturally attractive lands with the Tuareg people, the Fula people and other ethnic groups in the area. This medieval era migration is attested by the legends and mythologies within the Zarma community, with some mentioning their historic origins to be Malinke and Sarakholle, one driven by persecution by local Muslim rulers or inter-ethnic rivalries.

According to Abdourahmane Idrissa and Samuel Decalo, the Zarma people had settled the Dallol Bosso valley, called Boboye in Zarma language, by the 17th-century.
In times of migration the songhai (zarma people) are led by patriarch and in times of war gather under the order of a military chief call wonkoy like those who defeated the caliphate of Sokoto and raid these northern borders, defeated Tukulor invasions and raiding Tuareg confederations. The zabarma Emirate founded by itinerant Muslim monks and horse traders descended from their native Sahel was a late 19th century military entity that led from garrison town of kasena conquered much of the voltaic plateau ( south Burkina Faso, North and North Central Ghana), carved out the Gurunsi people, the Dagomba people, the Mandé peoples the Mossi people and kingdom of Wala territories.

Slavery
Slavery has been a historic practice in West Africa long before the arrival of colonialism. In Niger and Mali, where the largest population of Zarma people has historically lived and have their origins, there is textual evidence of a series of annual campaigns during the rules of Sunni 'Ali and Askiya Muhammad (Turé) to capture people as slaves, both for domestic use as well to export them to North Africa mainly Morocco, Algiers, Tunis and Tripoli. The 15th-century ruler Sunni Ali is an integral part of the legends revered by the Zarma people.

The slavery system was a large part of the society and political arrangement. According to Jean-Pierre Olivier de Sardan, the slave population accounted for nearly two-thirds to three-quarters of the total population of Songhay-Zarma people. These numbers are similar to the high percentages of slavery in other ethnic groups that prevailed in pre-colonial West Africa, according to Martin Klein. However, Bruce Hall cautions that while it is "certainly true that the majority of population" had a servile status, these colonial era estimates for "slaves" in Niger river area ethnic groups are exaggerations because there is difference between servile status and slavery status.

The ethnic groups including the Songhay-Zarma people, states Benedetta Rossi, stretching over the Sahelo-Sudanese have shared a political and economic system based on slavery from a pre-colonial period. The slaves were an economic asset, and they were used for farming, herding and for domestic work. The slavery system has been well developed and complex, according to Rossi, where a system of social stratification developed within the slaves and a master-slave status system survived even after slavery was officially abolished during the French colonial rule. The slave communities remain a part of memories of the Zarma people, states Alice Bellagamba.

Colonial era
The French colonial rulers came to regions inhabited by the Zarma people at the end of the 1890s, when the chiefs and warlords within the Zarma society were in an intra-ethnic conflict. The French picked the Zarmakoy Aouta of Dosso as their partner, and established a military post in what was then the village of Dosso in November 1898. The period that followed brought several natural disasters such as famines and locust attacks from 1901 to 1903. The French increased their presence during this period.

The French relied on the Dosso military post and Niger river valleys for replenishing their supplies, as they attempted to establish a much larger colonial zone in Sahel all the way to Chad. This led to conflicts and violence against the Zarma people, in a manner that repeated the violence and tribute system imposed on Zarma from "at least the early nineteenth century", state Dennis Cordell and Joel Gregory.

The French colonial rule established mines for resources in West Africa such as along the Gold Coast, and these mines were staffed with African labor that relied in large part with migrant Zarma people. Thousands of Zarma people travelled to various French mines, as well as to build roads and railroads to connect major sites of importance to the French rule. This migrant labor followed the pre-colonial tradition of Zarma warriors heading to Gold coast for booty, but colonial mines provided economic adventurism, however in many cases the migration was a means to "escape French economic exploitation".

Of the various ethnic groups in Niger, the early cooperation of the Zarma elite led to a legacy where Zarma interests have been promoted and they have continued to be a dominating part of the political elite after its complete independence in 1960.

Society and culture
The language, society and culture of the Zarma people is barely distinguishable from the Songhai people. Some scholars consider the Zarma people to be a part of and the largest ethnic sub-group of the Songhai – a group that includes nomads of Mali speaking the same language as the Zarma. Some study the group together as Zarma-Songhai people. However, both groups see themselves as two different people.

Social stratification

Jean-Pierre Olivier de Sardan, Tal Tamari and other scholars have stated that the Zarma people have traditionally been a socially stratified society, like the Songhai people at large, with their society featuring castes. According to the medieval and colonial era descriptions, their vocation is hereditary, and each stratified group has been endogamous. The social stratification has been unusual in two ways; one it embedded slavery, wherein the lowest strata of the population inherited slavery, and second the Zima or priests and Islamic clerics had to be initiated but did not automatically inherit that profession, making the cleric strata a pseudo-caste. According to Ralph Austen, a professor emeritus of African history, the caste system among the Zarma people was not as well developed as the caste system historically found in the African ethnic groups further west to them.

Louis Dumont, the 20th-century author famous for his classic Homo Hierarchicus, recognized the social stratification among Zarma-Songhai people as well as other ethnic groups in West Africa, but suggested that sociologists should invent a new term for West African social stratification system. Other scholars consider this a bias and isolationist because the West African system shares all elements in Dumont's system, including economic, ritual, spiritual, endogamous, elements of pollution, segregative and spread over a large region. According to Anne Haour – a professor of African Studies, some scholars consider the historic caste-like social stratification in Zarma-Songhai people to be a pre-Islam feature while some consider it derived from the Arab influence.

The different strata of the Zarma-Songhai people have included the kings and warriors, the scribes, the artisans, the weavers, the hunters, the fishermen, the leather workers and hairdressers (Wanzam), and the domestic slaves (Horso, Bannye). Each caste reveres its own guardian spirit. Some scholars such as John Shoup list these strata in three categories: free (chiefs, farmers and herders), servile (artists, musicians and griots), and the slave class. The servile group were socially required to be endogamous, while the slaves could be emancipated over four generations. The traditionally free strata of the Zerma people have owned property and herds, and these have dominated the political system and governments during and after the French colonial rule. Within the stratified social system, the Islamic system of polygynous marriages is a part of the Zarma people tradition, with preferred partners being cross cousins, and a system of ritualistic acceptance between co-wives. This endogamy is similar to other ethnic groups in West Africa.

Female genital mutilation
The women among Zarma people, like other ethnic groups of Sahel and West Africa, have traditionally practiced female genital mutilation (FGM). However, the prevalence rates have been lower and falling. According to UNICEF and the World Health Organization studies, in Zarma culture the female circumcision is called Haabize. It consists of two rituals. One is ritual cutting away the hymen of new born girls, second is clitoridectomy between the ages of 9 and 15 where either her prepuce is cut out or a part to all of clitoris and labia minora is cut then removed. The operation has been ritually done by the traditional barbers called wanzam.

Niger has attempted to end the FGM practice. According to UNICEF, these efforts have successfully and noticeably reduced the practice to a prevalence rate in the single digits (9% in Zarma ethnic group in 2006), compared to east-North Africa (Egypt to Somalia) where the FGM rates are very high.

Livelihood

The Zarma villages traditionally consist of walled off compounds where a family group called windi lives. Each compound has a head male and a compound may have several separate huts, each hut with the different wives of the head male. The huts are traditionally roundhouses, or circular shaped structures made of mud walls with a thatched straw conical roof.

The Zarma people grow maize, millet, sorghum, rice, tobacco, cotton and peanuts during the rainy season (June to November). They have traditionally owned herds of animals, which they rent out to others till they are ready to be sold for meat. Some own horses, a legacy of those Zerma people who historically belonged to the warrior class and were skilled cavalrymen in Islamic armies. Living along the River Niger, some Zarma people rely on fishing. The property inheritance and occupational descent is patrilineal. Many Zarma people, like Songhai, have migrated into coastal and prospering cities of West Africa, especially Ghana. Zarma people also grow guavas, mangoes, bananas, and citrus fruits.

Arts
The Zarma people, like their neighboring ethnic groups in West Africa, have a rich tradition of music, group dance known as Bitti Harey and singing. The common musical instruments that accompany these arts include gumbe (big drum), dondon (talking drums), molo or kuntigui (string instruments), goge (violin-like instrument). Some of this music also accompanies with folley, or spirit possession-related rituals.

See also
Songhai proper
Caste systems in Africa
Mande people
Mandinka people
Tuareg people
Zabarma Emirate - a Zarma Islamic state set up in the 19th century in Northern Ghana

References

Sources
 Decalo, S. (1979) Historical Dictionary of Niger, Scarecrow Press/Metuchen: London. .

External links

Links to recordings of Djerma music on the Web
Article on a single Zarma village and its diverse livelihoods by S Batterbury, 2001.

 
Ethnic groups in Benin
Ethnic groups in Ghana
Ethnic groups in Niger
Ethnic groups in Nigeria
Muslim communities in Africa
Ethnic groups in Burkina Faso
Ethnic groups in Togo
Ethnic groups in Ivory Coast